The Roanoke City Council is the governing body of the city of Roanoke, Virginia. Currently, the council has six members, all elected in an at-large manner, and a mayor elected in an individual election.

The City Council’s duties are primarily legislative. It also oversees financial decisions the city pursues. City Council directs the affairs of Roanoke by passing ordinances or adopting resolutions. Roanoke uses a weak-mayor political system in which the mayor is simply the "first of equals" on the City Council.

Current Council

Current City Council Members
Sherman P. Lea, Sr. (D) – Mayor
Joesph L. Cobb (D) – Vice-Mayor
Peter J. Volosin (D)
Vivian Sanchez-Jones (D)
 Luke W. Priddy (D)
Patricia White-Boyd (D)
Stephanie Moon Reynolds (I)

May 2018 Election
<ref>{{cite web|url=http://results.elections.virginia.gov/vaelections/2018%20May%20City%20General/Site/Locality/ROANOKE%20CITY/Index.html

See also
Roanoke, Virginia
List of mayors of Roanoke, Virginia
Local government in the United States

References

Roanoke, Virginia
Virginia city councils